is a Japanese football player. She plays for AC Nagano Parceiro in the WE League. She played for Japan national team.

Club career
Tomari was born in Nagoya on March 26, 1990. After graduating from Osaka University of Health and Sport Sciences, she joined Urawa Reds in 2012. In 2015, she moved to AC Nagano Parceiro. In 2018, she moved to Austrian Frauenliga club Wacker Innsbruck.

National team career
On July 27, 2017, Tomari debuted for Japan national team against Brazil. She played 2 games for Japan in 2017.

National team statistics

References

External links

Japan Football Association

1990 births
Living people
Osaka University of Health and Sport Sciences alumni
Association football people from Aichi Prefecture
Japanese women's footballers
Japan women's international footballers
Nadeshiko League players
Urawa Red Diamonds Ladies players
AC Nagano Parceiro Ladies players
Women's association football forwards